Carolina "Carola" Correa de Rojas Pinilla (born Carolina Correa Londoño; 25 January 1905 – 15 July 1986) was the wife of the 19th President of Colombia, Gustavo Rojas Pinilla, and served as First Lady of Colombia from 1953 to 1957.

On 25 May 1956 Correa, as First Lady of Colombia, was the first woman to be granted a Cédula de Ciudadania, a Colombian national identity document that extended citizenship to women and allowed them to participate in the political process. Her cédula number was 20,000,001; her daughter María Eugenia was granted the next card, number 20,000,002. Colombian women, including Correa and her daughter, were able to vote for the first time on 1 December 1957 during a national referendum.

Personal life
Carolina Correa Londoño was born on 25 January 1905 in Medellín, Antioquia to Emilio Correa Correa and Emilia Londoño Jaramillo. She married Gustavo Rojas Pinilla on 10 May 1930 at the Chapel of Saint Joseph of the Congregation of Christian Brothers in Medellín. Gustavo and Carolina had three children: Gustavo Emilio, María Eugenia, and Carlos.

See also
 Bertha Hernández Fernández

References

1905 births
1986 deaths
People from Medellín
Rojas family
First ladies of Colombia
Colombian suffragists